The 2023 Central American Women's Handball Championship took place in Managua, Nicaragua, from 28 February to 4 March 2023. It acted as a qualifying tournament for the 2023 Central American and Caribbean Games and the 2024 South and Central American Women's Handball Championship.

Results

Round robin
All times are local (UTC−06:00).

References

External links
Official website

Central American Handball Championship
Central American Women's Handball Championship
International sports competitions hosted by Nicaragua
Central American Women's Handball Championship
Central American Women's Handball Championship
Central American Women's Handball Championship